Benjamin Bastères (also known as Benji), born 9 in Bastia (Corsica), is a French rugby union player who plays as left prop for RC Toulonnais (1.83 m, 105 kg).

Career 
 Until 2001 : Bastia
 Since 2001 : RC Toulon

Honours 
 Pro D2 Champions : 2005, 2008
 Semi-finalist of Championnat de France Espoirs : 2006
 Championnat de France Reichel Finalist: 2005

External links 
  Player profile at lequipe.fr
  Statistics at itsrugby.fr

French rugby union players
Rugby union props
Sportspeople from Bastia
1984 births
RC Toulonnais players
Living people